Udagamandalam railway station, also referred to as Ooty railway station is a terminus station in Ooty, Tamil Nadu. The terminus is a part of the Nilgiri Mountain Railway, a World Heritage Site.

History 
The station was opened in year 1908, when Nilgiri Mountain Railway line was extended to Udagamandalam. The railway code for Udagamandalam  is UAM.

The heritage Nilgiri Mountain railway takes almost two hours of journey to travel down to town of Mettupalayam in Coimbatore at the foothill of Nilgiri mountains.

See also 
 Nilgiri Mountain Railway
 Kalka–Shimla railway

References

External links

Railway stations in Nilgiris district
Railway stations opened in 1908
Transport in Ooty
1908 establishments in India
Railway terminus in India
Mountain railways in India
Buildings and structures in Ooty
Tourist attractions in Ooty